The  was a  self-propelled gun developed by the Imperial Japanese Army for use in World War II.

History and design

The Type 4 Ha-To was conceived as a mobile fire support platform in late 1943. It made use of the already existing Type 3 300 mm heavy mortar mounted on a modified chassis that was based on the one used for the Type 4 Chi-To medium tank and on the Type 4 Chi-So armored medium tracked carrier. The armor was "thinner" than the Chi-To and the engine compartment was moved to the front. The mortar had a range of 3,000 m (1.9 mi) and launched a 170 kg (374 lb) projectile. The gun itself weighed close to 1.5 tons, and to keep the center of gravity from shifting and tipping the vehicle over, it could not be elevated more than 50 degrees.

The first prototype was completed in late 1944 and taken to the Imperial Japanese Army Academy for testing. Although testing indicated that it would be an effective weapon, it was expensive to produce, and the Japanese Army Technical Bureau shifted its attention to self-propelled multiple rocket launchers instead.

An additional three units were produced before the surrender of Japan, but none were used in combat.

Notes

References

External links
 Taki's Imperial Japanese Army Page - Akira Takizawa

World War II self-propelled artillery
300 mm artillery
Mitsubishi
Military vehicles introduced from 1940 to 1944